Vincent Laron "Vee" Sanford II (born December 5, 1990) is an American professional basketball player who last played for Victoria Libertas Pesaro of the Lega Basket Serie A. He played college basketball for Georgetown and Dayton.

He began his professional career in 2016 with s.Oliver Würzburg. Sanford averaged 11.3 points and 2.4 assists per game during the 2019-20 season with Limoges. On May 24, 2020, Sanford parted ways with the team.

In the summer of 2017, Sanford II played in The Basketball Tournament on ESPN for the Broad Street Brawlers.  He competed for the $2 million prize, and for the Brawlers, he averaged 24.5 points per game.  Sanford III helped the Brawlers reach the second round of the tournament, only then losing to Team Colorado 111-95.  He then Joined the Dayton alumni team , The Red Scare (basketball team) , for the 2019 edition of The Basketball Tournament. They defeated The Region TBT in the first round before advancing past Mid American Unity 88-86 in the second round. They then lost to eventual champions Carmens Crew in the regional finals. 
Sanford is known for his ability to hit the midrange shot with a variety of pull-ups and floaters.

On July 29, 2020, he has signed with Élan Béarnais of the French LNB Pro A. Sanford averaged 13.6 points, 3.3 rebounds, and 2.5 assists per game. On July 17, 2021, he signed with Victoria Libertas Pesaro of the Lega Basket Serie A.

References

External links

Eurobasket.com profile
Dayton Flyers bio

1990 births
Living people
American expatriate basketball people in France
American expatriate basketball people in Germany
American men's basketball players
Basketball players from Lexington, Kentucky
Dayton Flyers men's basketball players
Élan Chalon players
Georgetown Hoyas men's basketball players
Lexington Catholic High School alumni
Limoges CSP players
Olympique Antibes basketball players
Point guards
Shooting guards
S.Oliver Würzburg players
Victoria Libertas Pallacanestro players